was a Japanese daimyō of the Azuchi–Momoyama period, who ruled the Iwatsuki Domain. Masanaga, like his father Kiyonaga, served the Tokugawa clan.

Masanaga died in 1599, and was succeeded by his son Tadafusa.

1558 births
1599 deaths
Daimyo
Samurai